Mikhail Mishaqa or Michael Mishaka (March 20, 1800 – July 19, 1888;), also known as Doctor Mishaqa, was born in Rashmayyā, Lebanon, and is reputed to be "the first historian of modern Ottoman Syria" as well as the "virtual founder of the twenty-four equal quarter tone scale". Mishaqa's memoir of the 1860 Mount Lebanon civil war is valuable to historians, as it is the only account written by a survivor of the massacre of Syrian Christians in Damascus, Syria. In 1859 he was appointed vice-consul of the United States in Damascus.

Personal life 
Mikhail's great-grandfather, Jirjis Mishaqa I, converted to Greek Catholicism. Jirjis' father, Youssef Petraki, an ethnic Greek and Christian Orthodox, moved from Corfu, Greece to Tripoli, Lebanon to pursue the silk trade. As such, Petraki, named himself after an Arabic term describing the process of filtering silk fibres, mishaqa. Mikhail's father, Jirjis Mishaqa II, moved to Deir al-Qamar, then controlled by the Shihabs, to escape the religious repression of al-Jazzar, the governor of Sidon. In 1848, Mikhail Mishaqa converted from Greek Catholicism to Protestantism, after coming in contact with American Protestant missionaries and reading a translation of Evidence of the Truth of the Christian Religion... by Alexander Keith.

Career 
Mikhail Mishaqa began his career as a goldsmith but became a scribe and then chief treasurer for the Amir of Mount Lebanon, Bashir II's household. According to Leila Fawaz, Mikhail was well-educated;"At the first opportunity he showed off his knowledge and the ignorance of the offender. In such ways, Mishaqa continued to educate himself. He taught himself medicine and became a doctor." According to Touma, Mishaqa was the first theorist to propose a division of the octave into roughly twenty-four equal intervals (24-tone equal temperament, quarter tone scale), this being the current basis of the Arab tone system. However, Mishaqa's work "Essay on the Art of Music for the Emir Shihāb" (al-Risāla al-shihābiyya fī 'l-ṣinā‘a al-mūsīqiyya) (c. 1840) is devoted to the topic but also makes clear his teacher Sheikh Muhammad al-‘Attār (1764–1828) was one of many already familiar with the concept, although al-‘Attār did not publish his writings on the subject.

Mishaqa's most important works as a historian include the much quoted "A Response to a Proposition by Beloved Ones" (1873) (al-Jawāb `alā Iqtirāḥ al-Aḥbāb) and "History of events which took place in Syria on its coast and the Mount in 1782-1841" (1843) ( Ta’rih Hawadit Jarat bil-Sham wa-Sawahil Barr al-Sham wa-l-Jabal, 1782-1841 m).

See also
Maqam
Protestantism in Lebanon

Notes

Sources
Habib Hassan Touma (1996). The Music of the Arabs, trans. Laurie Schwartz. Portland, Oregon: Amadeus Press. .
Maalouf, Shireen (2003). "Mikhā'il Mishāqa: Virtual Founder of the Twenty-Four Equal Quartertone Scale", Journal of the American Oriental Society, Vol. 123, No. 4. (October–December 2003), pp. 835–40.
Zachs, Fruma (2001). "Mikhail Mishaqa - The First Historian of Modern Syria", British Journal of Middle Eastern Studies, Vol. 28, No. 1 (May 2001), pp. 67–87.

1800 births
1888 deaths
Music theorists
19th-century historians from the Ottoman Empire
Musical tuning
Historians of the Middle East
Lebanese Protestants
Protestantism in Lebanon
Syrian Christians
Arab Christians
Converts to Protestantism from Roman Catholicism
Lebanese people of Greek descent
19th-century musicologists